Pragati-I Combined Cycle Gas Power Station is located in New Delhi. The power plant is one of the gas based power plants of Pragati Power Corporation Limited (PPCL). The gas for it is sourced from GAIL HBJ Pipeline. Source of water is from sewage treatment plant at Delhi Gate.

Capacity 
It has an installed capacity of 330 MW.

The power plant have three power generating units, all these units were commissioned during 2002-03 period.

 Two GT Units of 104 MW (N) each.
 One ST Unit of 122 MW.

See also
 Pragati-III Combined Cycle Power Plant

References

External links
 Power Stations in Delhi

Natural gas-fired power stations in Delhi
2002 establishments in Delhi
Energy infrastructure completed in 2002